One Piece at a Time is the 54th album by American country singer Johnny Cash, released in 1976 on Columbia Records. "One Piece at a Time," which was a #1 hit, is a humorous tale of an auto worker on the Detroit assembly line who puts together a car out of parts he swipes from the plant. "Sold Out of Flag Poles" also charted as a single, reaching #29 on the country singles charts. "Committed to Parkview", a Cash original, would be re-recorded in 1985 by Cash, Waylon Jennings, Kris Kristofferson and Willie Nelson, collectively known as The Highwaymen, on their first album, Highwayman; it is one of the few country songs sung from the perspective of a patient at a mental hospital.

The album is notable for being credited to "Johnny Cash and the Tennessee Three", a credit that hadn't been used on Cash releases since the 1960s, and for featuring Cash's recording of "Love Has Lost Again," written by his daughter, Rosanne Cash prior to the launch of her own solo career. On "Let There Be Country", the album's opening track, Cash shares songwriting credit with Shel Silverstein, who had written Cash's biggest hit up to this time, "A Boy Named Sue".

"Go On Blues" was later re-recorded during the American Recordings session with Rick Rubin. It was not on the album but part of the promo single for "Delia's Gone".

Track listing
All tracks composed by Johnny Cash, except where indicated.

Personnel
 Johnny Cash - vocals, acoustic guitar
 Bob Wootton, Bobby Thompson, Pete Wade, Dave Kirby, Jerry Hensley, Jack Routh, Helen Carter Jones, Jimmy Capps - guitar
 Marshall Grant, Henry Strzelecki, Joe Allen - bass
 WS Holland, Willie Ackerman, Jerry Carrigan, Kenny Malone - drums
 Lloyd Green - steel guitar
 Tommy Williams - mandolin
 Tommy Jackson, Buddy Spicher, Johnny Gimble - fiddle
 Bobby Wood, David Briggs, Larry McCoy, Earl Poole Ball - piano
 Charlie McCoy - harmonica
 George Tidwell - trumpet
 The Nashville Edition - vocals

Additional personnel
Produced by Charlie Bragg and Don Davis
"Michigan City Howdy Do" and "Daughter of a Railroad Man" produced by Charlie Bragg
"Committed to Parkview" produced by Don Davis
Recorded at House of Cash Recording Studio
Engineers: Charlie Bragg, Roger Tucker, Danny Jones, Chuck Bragg
Cover photo: Mike Woosley
Liner notes: Johnny Cash

Charts
Album – Billboard (United States)

Singles - Billboard (United States)

External links
Luma Electronic entry on One Piece at a Time

One Piece at a Time
One Piece at a Time
Albums produced by Don Davis (record producer)
One Piece at a Time